Hamish Grant McNeil (16 November 1934 – 15 October 2017) was a Scottish former footballer who played in the Football League as a wing half for Colchester United.

Career

Born in Alva, McNeill began his career with Scottish junior club Bonnyrigg Rose Athletic before joining English Football League side Colchester United in 1957. He made his debut for the club on 21 September 1957 and scored Colchester's goal in a 1–1 draw with Bournemouth. He played only once more for Colchester, in the following game at home to Northampton Town, a 4–1 defeat. After leaving the club, McNeill joined non-league team Cambridge City.

References

1934 births
Living people
Sportspeople from Clackmannanshire
Scottish footballers
Association football forwards
Bonnyrigg Rose Athletic F.C. players
Colchester United F.C. players
Cambridge City F.C. players
English Football League players
Association football wing halves